Cosmic Cowboy Souvenir is the second album by American singer-songwriter Michael Martin Murphey. Recorded at Ray Stevens Sound Laboratory in Nashville, Tennessee, the album consists of songs that are "borderline romantic" without being too intricate or too commercial sounding, and "manages to keep its simplicity and rustic charm intact." Cosmic Cowboy Souvenir peaked at number 196 on the Billboard 200.

Track listing
All tracks composed by Michael Martin Murphey
 "Cosmic Cowboy, Pt. 1" – 3:54
 "Alleys of Austin" – 5:05
 "South Canadian River Song" – 7:14
 "Blessings in Disguise" – 3:43
 "Temperature Train" – 3:54
 "Drunken Lady of the Morning" – 4:22
 "Prometheus Busted" – 3:40
 "Honolulu" – 4:22
 "Rolling Hills" – 4:25

Credits
Music
 Michael Martin Murphey – vocals, acoustic guitar, keyboards, photography, arranger
 Gary P. Nunn – synthesizer, bass, electric guitar, creative consultant, background vocals, keyboards, melodica
 Bob Livingston – bass, electric guitar, background vocals
 Craig Hillis – electric guitar
 Herb Steiner – mandolin, pedal steel guitar
 Michael McGreary – drums, rhythm
 Willis Alan Ramsey – background vocals

Production
 Bob Johnston – producer
 Larry Cansler – string arrangements
 Michael Jackson – string engineer
 Allan McDougall – editing, mastering, string engineer, special assistance
 Bob Potter – engineer, mixing
 Warren Barnett – mastering
 Glenn A. Baker – assistant, interviewer
 Kevin Mueller – release preparation
 Peter Shillito – assistant
 Eric Kronfeld – coordination
 Ryan Murphey – editinghttps://www.youtube.com/watch?v=jMwRLC5s5Hs
 Bill Holloway - Artwork
 Louis Cook – design, layout design
 Ian McFarlane – assistant
 Jeff Layan – coordination
 Marty Machat – coordination

Other recordings

The Nitty Gritty Dirt Band recorded "Cosmic Cowboy" on their 1974 album, Stars & Stripes Forever.

References

External links
 Michael Martin Murphey's Official Website
 

1973 albums
Michael Martin Murphey albums
Albums produced by Bob Johnston
A&M Records albums